The Red Death may refer to:

 The Masque of the Red Death, an 1842 short story by Edgar Allan Poe
 The Masque of the Red Death (1964 film), a 1964 film starring Vincent Price
 Masque of the Red Death (1989 film), a 1989 remake of the 1964 film
 Red Death (Greyhawk), a fictional plague in the World of Greyhawk campaign setting for the Dungeons & Dragons role-playing game
 Red Death, a fictional disease in Osmosis Jones
 Red Death, a fictional dragon in the film How to Train Your Dragon (2010)
 Masque of the Red Death (Ravenloft), a campaign setting for the Dungeons & Dragons role-playing game
 The Red Death, a New York death metal band
 Red Death at 6:14, a single by the American garage rock band The White Stripes.
 Red Death, a character on the animated television series The Venture Bros
 Red Death, a version of DC Comics character Batman from an alternate Earth.